Rounin may refer to:
Rounin (TV series), a fantasy and martial arts series shown in Philippine TV in 2007
Rōnin, a samurai with no lord or master during the feudal period of Japan (1185–1868)

See also
Ronin (disambiguation)